Holcocerus rjabovi is a moth in the family Cossidae. It is found in Armenia and Azerbaijan.

The length of the forewings is 17–20 mm. The wings are white with a narrow brown border at the external margin. The hindwings are white.

References

Natural History Museum Lepidoptera generic names catalog

Cossinae
Moths described in 2006
Moths of Asia
Moths of Europe